Robyn Dixon is a journalist and Moscow bureau chief for The Washington Post.

Early life and career 
Dixon was born and raised in Melbourne, Australia. She graduated from Presbyterian Ladies' College, Melbourne. Her mother is a housewife and her father is a judge in the County Court of Victoria. Since 1978, Dixon has worked as an editor for The Herald newspaper in Australia. From 1993, she worked as a Moscow correspondent for The Sydney Morning Herald and The Age for four years.

Since 1999, she worked as a foreign correspondent for the Los Angeles Times. In 2003, she moved with her daughter Sylvia to Johannesburg, South Africa, where she became bureau chief for the Los Angeles Times; and in 2018 she became bureau chief in Beijing, China.

Since November 2019, she has been the Moscow bureau chief for The Washington Post.

Dixon speaks English, Russian and French.

Awards 

 2007 Sigma Delta Chi Award for international reporting;
 2008 Robert F. Kennedy Journalism Award for "outstanding reporting of the lives and strife of disadvantaged people throughout the world";
 2008 Citation by the Overseas Press Club in relation to the Joe and Laurie Dine award for international reporting dealing with human rights;
 2009 Batten Medal by the American Society of News Editors;
 2009 Daniel Pearl Award for courage and integrity in reporting;
 2016 Madeline Dane Ross Award by the Overseas Press Club for the "best international reporting in print or digital showing a concern for the human condition".

References 

The Washington Post journalists
Australian women journalists
Los Angeles Times people
Living people
Year of birth missing (living people)